The Niessliaceae are a family of fungi in the Ascomycota, class Sordariomycetes. The family was updated in 2020.

Genera
As accepted by Wijayawardene et al. 2020; (with amount of species)

Atronectria  (2)
Circinoniesslia  (1)
Cryptoniesslia  (1)
Eucasphaeria  (2)

Malmeomyces  (1)

Melchioria  (6)
Miyakeomyces  (1)
Myrmaeciella  (2)
Myrtacremonium  (1)
Neoeucasphaeria  (1)
Niesslia  (43) 
Nitschkiopsis  (1)
Paraniesslia  (2)
Pseudohyaloseta  (1)
Pseudonectriella  (1)
Pseudorhynchia  (2)
Rosasphaeria  (1)
Taiwanascus  (2)
Trichosphaerella  (4) 
Valetoniella  (3)
Valetoniellopsis  (1)

References

 
Ascomycota families